Major General Franklin Cummings Sibert (January 3, 1891 – June 24, 1980) was a United States Army officer. During World War II, Sibert was originally the commander of the 6th Infantry Division but was promoted to command the X Corps of General Walter Krueger's US Sixth Army. His corps took part in the landing operations of the Battle of Leyte in the Philippines.

Early years

Sibert was born on January 3, 1891, in Bowling Green, Kentucky, as a son of future Major General William L. Sibert and his wife Mary Margaret Cummings. He attended the United States Military Academy at West Point, New York and graduated on June 12, 1912. Several of his fellow graduates, like Sibert himself, would attain general officer rank, such as Gilbert R. Cook, John S. Wood, Wade H. Haislip, Stephen J. Chamberlin, Walton Walker, Harry J. Malony, William H. Wilbur, Robert McGowan Littlejohn, Archibald Vincent Arnold, Millard Harmon, Raymond O. Barton, Albert E. Brown, and Walter M. Robertson. He was commissioned a second lieutenant in the infantry on the same date. One year later, Sibert married Helen Mildred Rogers on March 4, 1913.

During World War I, Sibert served with the American Expeditionary Forces (AEF) in France, initially as an aide-de-camp to his father, who commanded the 1st Division from June−December 1917, before commanding a machine gun battalion. With the war over, he subsequently served with the allied occupation forces in Germany.

After the War, Sibert attended the Infantry School at Fort Benning in 1924, the Command and General Staff College at Fort Leavenworth in 1925 and the Army War College in 1929. His next few years were spent mainly as a staff officer or in a teaching role, returning to the Command and General Staff College, this time as an instructor.

In 1934, Sibert served as a battalion commanding officer in the 29th Infantry Regiment and subsequently served in the various infantry positions at Fort Benning or as the Member of the Infantry Board.

World War II
In 1939, Sibert spent some time in Michigan as a commanding officer of Fort Wayne or Camp Custer. In September 1941 Sibert was promoted to the rank of brigadier general and was appointed to the staff of Lieutenant general Joseph W. Stilwell, Commander of the U.S. Forces in China-Burma-India Theater. Sibert accompanied Stillwell in the retreat from Burma in 1942.

Sibert was then appointed the commanding officer of the 6th Infantry Division. He replaced Major General Durward S. Wilson in this capacity. He was also promoted to the rank of major general on March 11, 1942 and his assistant division commander (ADC) was Brigadier General Julius Ochs Adler. He participated in the New Guinea and Philippines campaigns. He was highly regarded by Lieutenant General Walter Krueger, who in July 1944 radioed his superior, General Douglas MacArthur, about Sibert:

After commanding the 6th Infantry Division, he commanded the US X Corps from August 1944 until the end of the war. Under his command his X Corps participated in the New Guinea, Southern Philippines and Leyte campaigns.

Post World War II
Sibert retired from the Army on June 30, 1946. After his retirement, he and his wife lived in Fort Walton Beach, Florida, until his death on June 24, 1980. He was buried at Arlington National Cemetery.

Decorations

Bibliography

References

External links

Franklin Cummings Sibert at Arlington National Cemetery site
6th Infantry Division History
Battle of Leyte 
Generals of World War II
United States Army Officers 1939−1945

|-

1891 births
1980 deaths
Army Black Knights men's ice hockey players
United States Army Infantry Branch personnel
People from Bowling Green, Kentucky
United States Military Academy alumni
United States Army Command and General Staff College alumni
United States Army generals
Military personnel from Kentucky
Burials at Arlington National Cemetery
Recipients of the Distinguished Service Medal (US Army)
Recipients of the Silver Star
Recipients of the Legion of Merit
Recipients of the Air Medal
United States Army personnel of World War I
United States Army generals of World War II